

Squad

Staff
 Khalifa Mobarak – Interim Coach
 Rodríguez – Assistant Coach
 Humaid Yousuf – Team Manager
 Luiz Carlos – Fitness Coach
 Yassin Bentaalla – Goalkeepers Coach
 Dr. Taha Al Rawy – Team Doctor
  Leandro Yoshinada Suzuki – Physiotherapist
 Rarim – Masseur

Transfers

In

Out 

For Last Season's Transfers List Please visit 2009–10 Al Wasl F.C. season

Tournaments

Pre-Season Matches & Friendlies

Germany Camp
Based on the success of the previous season's camp, Al Wasl FC picked Nuremberg, Germany again to hold its annual summer camp. The team flew to Germany on 15 July 2010 and played four friendly matches during the camp.

The Dubai International Football Championship
Upon the return of the team from Germany, Al Wasl participated and hosted the Dubai International Football Championship which is a friendly mini-tournament held by the Dubai Sports Council in Zabeel Stadium. The other participants were Al-Ahli Dubai, Al-Wihdat Amman from Jordan, and Al-Merreikh from Sudan. Zamalek SC of Egypt was supposed to participate but it apologized at the last minute. 
The draw of the tournament was done on 12 August and Al Wasl played against Al-Merreikh on 16 August. The second match was against Al-Wihdat Amman on 19 August regardless the results of the first round as per the agreement of Al Wasl's coach Sérgio Farias and Al-Ahli's coach David O'Leary, their teams did not play against each other in the tournament due to having to play each other in the second round of the UAE Football League.
Al Wasl was crowned as the tournament's Champion after winning both its matches. Its player Mohammed Jamal was picked as the tournament's Most Valuable Player and the Goalkeeper Majed Nasser as the best goalkeeper with zero goals conceded.

Results
Kickoff times are in UAE Time (UTC+4).

Top Scorers

UAE Premier League 2010–11
Finishing fifth last season, Al Wasl entered the new season with a new coach, a new foreign signing, some local signings, and much hope.

Standing

Results
Kickoff times are in UAE Time (UTC+4).

Results by round

Top Scorers

An own goal has also been scored for AlWasl by Al Dhafra Club's player Khiri Khilfan in the 4th Round

UAE President's Cup 2010–11

After a disappointing elimination from the Round of 16 in the previous season, Al Wasl is planning to put in a better display this season. Everything went as planned until the Semi-final against Al Wahda where Al Wasl FC conceded 2 goals in the first half, then failed to score more than one in the second half despite dominating the entire half. This was Al-Wasl's last chance to win an official tournament in the 2010–11 Season.

Results
Kickoff times are in UAE Time (UTC+4).

Top Scorers

Etisalat Cup 2010–11

The Etisalat Cup is a gap-filler between the official tournaments. It does not involve the International Players. Al Wasl's performance was promising in the tournament, but it was eliminated in the semi-finals after losing to Al Ain 2–3 in a match that witnessed the Fastest Equalizer in the History of Football scored by Fran Yeste.

Standing

Results

Top Scorers

Season Top scorers

Last updated on 29 May 2011

Season Highlights
 Al Wasl's League away match against Al Jazira on 22 October 2010, attracted 28,164 fans in Al Jazira Mohammed bin Zayed Stadium, making it the highest attended match in the season.
 Al Wasl was the second longest team to top the league table this season, staying there for 3 consecutive rounds (4–6).
 Al Wasl's Etisalat Cup Semi-final match against Al Ain Club witnessed the Fastest Equalizer in the History of Football scored by Fran Yeste.

Other Seasons
 2008–09 Al Wasl FC season
 2009–10 Al Wasl FC season

See also
 2010–11 UAE Premier League
 Al Wasl FC
 Al Wasl SC

References

Al Wasl
2011